The Balashikha Arena is a 6,000-seat multi-purpose arena in Balashikha, Russia. Opened in 2007, it replaced Vityaz Ice Palace as the home of HC MVD, a Kontinental Hockey League ice hockey team.

The 2017 national rink bandy cup took place in the arena.

Schools and divisions
On the territory of the Arena "Balashikha" there is a children's and youth sports school "Olympian" (ice hockey and figure skating sections). 1,000 children and adolescents attend the school. There are 18 groups of figure skating, and 13 hockey teams.

At the complex territory, the branch of the Todes dance school-studio is opened.

References

External links
Photos of new arena

Indoor ice hockey venues in Russia
Indoor arenas in Russia
HC MVD